The Qarabağ 2007–08 season was Qarabağ's 15th Azerbaijan Premier League season, and their only full season with Rasim Kara as their manager. They finished the season in 5th place, and were knocked out of the Azerbaijan Cup at the Quarterfinal stage by Inter Baku.

Squad

Transfers

Summer

In:

 

Out:

Winter

In:

Out:

Competitions

Azerbaijan Premier League

Results

Table

Azerbaijan Cup

Squad statistics

Appearances and goals

|-
|colspan="14"|Players away from Qarabağ on loan:

|-
|colspan="14"|Players who appeared for Qarabağ that left during the season:

|}

Goal scorers

Notes
Qarabağ have played their home games at the Tofiq Bahramov Stadium since 1993 due to the ongoing situation in Quzanlı.

References

External links 
 Official Site
 http://www.weltfussball.at/teams/fk-qarabag/2009/2/
 Qarabağ at Soccerway.com

Qarabağ FK seasons
Qarabag